Erik Černák (born 28 May 1997) is a Slovak professional ice hockey defenceman for the Tampa Bay Lightning of the National Hockey League (NHL). He was selected by the Los Angeles Kings in the second round, 43rd overall, in the 2015 NHL Entry Draft. Černák won back-to-back Stanley Cup championships with the Lightning in 2020 and 2021.

Playing career
Černák began his youth career with HC Košice before playing one season in the junior youth hockey team within the Slovan Bratislava system before returning to HC Košice's youth team on 11 June 2013. He made his senior professional debut with HC Košice in the 2013–14 season. He split the season between HC Košice and Orange 20, the Slovakian national junior under-20 team.

After his second year with HC Košice in which he registered 5 goals and 13 points in 43 games, Černák's promising potential was recognized as he was ranked just outside the top-ten European prospect skaters eligible for the 2015 NHL Entry Draft. He and goaltender Matej Tomek were the only Slovakian prospects to partake in the NHL draft combine in Buffalo, New York, prior to the draft. On 14 July 2015, Černák signed a three-year, entry-level contract with the Los Angeles Kings of the National Hockey League.

After attending the Kings' 2016 training camp, Černák was re-assigned to their American Hockey League (AHL) affiliate, the Ontario Reign, training camp. Despite an impressive play at the AHL level, he was returned to junior to play a second season with the Ontario Hockey League (OHL)'s Erie Otters for the 2016–17 season. On 26 February 2017, the Kings traded Černák (along with Peter Budaj and a 2017 seventh-round draft pick) to the Tampa Bay Lightning in exchange for goaltender Ben Bishop and a 2017 fifth-round pick.

On 13 November 2018, Černák made his NHL debut in a 2–1 defeat to the Buffalo Sabres at the KeyBank Center. On 19 November, Černák recorded his first NHL point with an assist to Victor Hedman as the Lightning lost 3–2 to the Nashville Predators. On 2 February 2019, Černák recorded his first career NHL goal against the New York Rangers at Madison Square Garden. The goal came in a 3–2 Lightning win.

On 22 December 2020, Černák signed a three-year, $8.85 million contract with the Lightning.

On 13 July 2022, Černák signed an eight-year, $41.6 million contract extension with the Lightning.

Personal life
Černák is a cousin of Christián Jaroš, who plays in the New Jersey Devils organization.

Career statistics

Regular season and playoffs

International

Awards and honors

References

External links
 

1997 births
Living people
Erie Otters players
HC Košice players
Los Angeles Kings draft picks
Slovak expatriate ice hockey players in the United States
Slovak ice hockey defencemen
Sportspeople from Košice
Stanley Cup champions
Syracuse Crunch players
Tampa Bay Lightning players